Herbert Lawford defeated Otway Woodhouse, 6–5, 6–4, 6–0 in the All Comers' Final, but the reigning champion John Hartley defeated Lawford, 6–3, 6–2, 2–6, 6–3 in the challenge round to win the gentlemen's singles tennis title at the 1880 Wimbledon Championships.

Draw

Challenge round

All comers' finals

Top half

Section 1

Section 2

Bottom half

Section 3

Section 4

References

External links

Singles
Wimbledon Championship by year – Men's singles